Alexander Brandl (born 3 November 1971) is an Austrian butterfly swimmer. He competed in two events at the 1992 Summer Olympics.

References

External links
 

1971 births
Living people
Austrian male butterfly swimmers
Olympic swimmers of Austria
Swimmers at the 1992 Summer Olympics
Place of birth missing (living people)